Juan Mora Fernández (July 12, 1784, San José, Costa Rica – November 16, 1854) was Costa Rica's first elected head of state.  He was considered a liberal and decided to move the capital from Cartago to Puntarenas.  Juan Mora was elected as the first head of state in 1825. He is remembered for instituting land reform, and he followed a progressive course.  As a consequence of his land reform structure, he inadvertently created an elite class of powerful coffee barons. The barons eventually overthrew one of his later successors, José María Alfaro Zamora.

From 1850 to 1854 he was Magistrate and President of the Supreme Court of Justice of Costa Rica, he died shortly after he resigned.

External links
 

1784 births
1854 deaths
People from San José, Costa Rica
Costa Rican people of Spanish descent
Presidents of Costa Rica
Vice presidents of Costa Rica
19th-century Costa Rican people
18th-century Costa Rican people
Supreme Court of Justice of Costa Rica judges
Costa Rican liberals